Book-It Repertory Theatre (often shortened to "Book-It") is a regional theatre located in Seattle, Washington. It is a 501-c(3) registered nonprofit corporation, and is devoted to "transforming great literature into great theatre through simple and sensitive production and to inspiring its audiences to read". Founded in 1987, it is now led by Co-Artistic Directors Jane Jones and Myra Platt, and is a 2012 Governor's Arts Award winner and 2010 Mayor's Arts Award winner. It is a member of Theatre Puget Sound and a part of The Kennedy Center's Partners in Education Program.

History

Book-It Repertory Theatre's history begins in 1986, when Co-Artistic Director Jane Jones led the 29th Street Project in New York City, an artistic collective that comprised graduates and company members from the American Conservatory Theater in San Francisco, to experiment with performing short stories for the stage.

After moving to Seattle in 1987, Jane Jones, Tony Pasqualini, Mark Jenkins, Robyn Smith, and Sarah Brooke, among others, formed The Collective at the Pasqualini/Smith acting studio in a three-story walk-up on Pine Street in Seattle's Capitol Hill. Myra Platt, Book-It's future Co-Artistic Director, joined The Collective in 1988. Members of The Collective began to experiment with the concept of Book-It by adapting literature into theatre. They began by experimenting with the performance of short stories. It became an official registered nonprofit under the name Book-It in 1990, and at this time mainly toured to schools and libraries with its performances. Book-It established its first main stage home in 1995, in a 50-seat theatre on Westlake Avenue. Several early shows were performed on Seattle Repertory Theatre stages, until in 2000 Book-It was able to move to their current location at Seattle Center.

When Book-It first moved to Seattle Center, their location was called the Center House. It is now known as The Armory.

In 2019, Book-It announced that founding co-artistic directors Jane Jones and Myra Platt would step down from their roles in summer of 2020.

Book-It Style
All of the shows produced by Book-It adhere to a specific style called "Book-It Style," which preserves the author's exact words in the script rather than changing them for the stage. The words and phrases in the book are acted out in dialogue on stage, including descriptions and even taglines. The Book-It Style doesn't rely on a designated narrator for these moments but instead distributes the narrative: descriptions, inner thoughts, etc., among the characters, giving the audience clues about a character based on "point of view."

Arts and Education Program
Book-It Repertory Theatre's Arts and Education Program (formerly called "Book-It All Over") involves a host of different activities aimed at promoting literacy and a love of reading in children. Book-It was able to expand this program thanks to a grant from the Hearst Foundation.

Touring series
The touring series involves several adaptations of books for children or young adults, and travels to libraries, community centers, and schools in the Seattle area. These performances include a book for each student as well as a study guide and interactive workshop. One of the shows that tours every year is called "Danger: Books!" and features actors reading from books that have been banned or challenged in the US.

Family Fun Series
This series takes place on the main stage, and usually hosts about three shows per season. They include a short play based on a children's or young adult book, a book-themed craft project, and workshops for younger and older children to participate in after the performance. Parents are encouraged to attend these performances with their children.

Student Matinee Series
 Like many theatres, Book-It hosts student matinees for some of their (audience-appropriate) main stage shows, offering a low-cost option for teachers to bring students to the shows on school trips.

Residencies
Book-It describes a teacher residency as a "long-term customized program designed with classroom teachers to address specific curricula, academic standards, and students' needs." These programs include a touring series production as well.

Teacher training
Book-It offers workshops for groups of teachers and also participates in a five-day summer program in collaboration with other Seattle area theatres called Bringing Theatre into the Classroom.

Mainstage Productions

1999-2000
 Jane Eyre by Charlotte Brontë
 Owen Meany's Christmas Pageant by John Irving
 Double Indemnity by James M. Cain
 The Awakening by Kate Chopin

2000-2001
 Pride and Prejudice by Jane Austen
 Owen Meany's Christmas Pageant by John Irving
 Silver Water by Amy Bloom
 Sweet Thursday by John Steinbeck
 In a Shallow Grave by James Purdy

2001-2002
 Lady Chatterley's Lover by D.H. Lawrence
 Owen Meany's Christmas Pageant by John Irving
 Ethan Frome by Edith Wharton
 If I Die in a Combat Zone, Box Me Up and Ship Me Home by Tim O'Brien
 Howard's End by E.M. Forster

2002-2003
 Cowboys are My Weakness by Pam Houston
 Owen Meany's Christmas Pageant by John Irving
 A Christmas Memory by Truman Capote
 A Child's Christmas in Wales by Dylan Thomas
 I Know Why the Caged Bird Sings by Dr. Maya Angelou
 Hard Times by Charles Dickens
 Breathing Lessons by Anne Tyler

2003-2004
 Dracula by Bram Stoker
 Red Ranger Came Calling by Berkeley Breathed
 Pride and Prejudice by Jane Austen
 Cry, the Beloved Country by Alan Paton
 Travels with Charley by John Steinbeck

2004-2005
 Waxwings by Jonathan Raban
 Red Ranger Came Calling by Berkeley Breathed
 Rebecca by Daphne du Maurier
 Giant by Edna Ferber
 The Awakening by Kate Chopin

2005-2006
 Don Quixote by Miguel de Cervantes
 Little Women by Louisa May Alcott
 Bud, Not Buddy by Christopher Paul Curtis
 Plainsong by Kent Haruf
 House of Mirth by Edith Wharton

2006-2007
 Broken for You by Stephanie Kallos
 Bud, Not Buddy by Christopher Paul Curtis
 A Tale of Two Cities by Charles Dickens
 Rhoda: A Life in Stories by Ellen Gilchrist
 The House of Spirits by Isabel Allende

2007-2008
 Snow Falling on Cedars by David Guterson
 Peter Pan by J.M. Barrie
 Persuasion by Jane Austen
 The Highest Tide by Jim Lynch

2008-2009
 Even Cowgirls Get the Blues by Tom Robbins 
 My Antonia by Willa Cather
 Moby Dick by Herman Melville
 The Beautiful Things that Heaven Bears by Dinaw Mengestu
 Night Flight by Antoine de Saint-Exupéry

2009-2010
 A Confederacy of Dunces by John Kennedy Toole
 Emma by Jane Austen
 The River Why by David James Duncan
 The Cider House Rules: Part 1 by John Irving and adapted by Peter Parnell

2010-2011
 The Cider House Rules: Part 2 by John Irving and adapted by Peter Parnell
 Red Ranger Came Calling by Berkeley Breathed
 Great Expectations by Charles Dickens
 Sense and Sensibility by Jane Austen
 Border Songs by Jim Lynch

2011-2012
 Owen Meany's Christmas Pageant by John Irving
 Prairie Nocturne by Ivan Doig
 The Art of Racing in the Rain by Garth Stein

2012-2013
 Hotel on the Corner of Bitter and Sweet by Jamie Ford
 Owen Meany's Christmas Pageant by John Irving
 Anna Karenina by Leo Tolstoy
 Adventures of Huckleberry Finn by Mark Twain
 The Financial Lives of the Poets by Jess Walter

2013-2014
 She's Come Undone by Wally Lamb
 Frankenstein; Or, the Modern Prometheus by Mary Shelley
 Truth Like the Sun by Jim Lynch
 The Amazing Adventures of Kavalier & Clay by Michael Chabon

2014-2015
 I Am of Ireland: A Collection of Stories, Song, and Dance from short story authors Frank O'Connor, W. B. Yeats, Mary Lavin, and Paul Vincent Carroll
 Pride and Prejudice by Jane Austen
 The Dog of the South by Charles Portis
 Little Bee by Chris Cleave
 Slaughterhouse-Five by Kurt Vonnegut

2015-2016
 What We Talk About When We Talk About Love by Raymond Carver
 Emma by Jane Austen
 The Brothers K by David James Duncan

2016-2017
 A Tale for the Time Being by Ruth Ozeki
 Treasure Island by Robert Louis Stevenson
 A Moveable Feast by Ernest Hemingway
 Welcome to Braggsville by T. Geronimo Johnson

2017-2018
 I Know Why the Caged Bird Sings by Dr. Maya Angelou
 Howl's Moving Castle by Diana Wynne Jones
 The Maltese Falcon by Dashiell Hammett
 The Brief Wondrous Life of Oscar Wao by Junot Díaz
 The Picture of Dorian Gray by Oscar Wilde

2018-2019
 Jane Eyre by Charlotte Brontë
 My Ántonia by Willa Cather
 American Junkie by Tom Hansen
 Returning the Bones by Gin Hammond
 Behold the Dreamers by Imbolo Mbue

2019-2020
 Everything is Illuminated by Jonathan Safran Foer
 Howl's Moving Castle by Diana Wynne Jones
 The Turn of the Screw by Henry James
 The Story of Edgar Sawtelle by David Wroblewski

Circumbendibus
The new Circumbendibus series is an off-the-main-stage series featuring non-traditional texts. Book-It started this series in the fall of 2012 with three shows: one based on food writing and cookbooks, one based on geek literature and graphic novels, and one based on a collection of short stories. The short story collection was Jesus' Son by Denis Johnson, and this was expanded and re-located for the second Circumbedibus series in 2013.

External links
Book-It Repertory Theatre official website
King 5 News
Kennedy Center
Aha! on Book-It Literacy Programs
Seattle Times
Seattle Foundation
Encore Media Group Arts Programs

References

Culture of Seattle
Seattle Center
Theatres in Washington (state)
Theatre companies in Washington (state)
Regional theatre in the United States
Tourist attractions in Seattle